Kon is a surname in a number of cultures and may refer to:

Bolesław Kon (1906–1936), Polish concert pianist
 Chiaki Kon, Japanese anime director 
 Fabio Kon, Brazilian computer scientist
 Feliks Kon (1864–1941), Polish communist activist
 Fyodor Kon, 16th-century Russian military engineer and architect
 Haruhiko Kon (born 1910), Japanese field hockey player
 Henech Kon (1890-1972), Polish Jewish composer and performer 
 Hidemi Kon (1903–1984), Japanese literary critic and essayist
 Igor Kon (1928–2011), Russian philosopher, psychologist, and sexologist
James Kon, also spelt Kone (born 1987), South Sudanese footballer
 Marko Kon (born 1972), Serbian singer
 Michiko Kon (born 1955), Japanese photographer
 Satoshi Kon (1963–2010), Japanese director of anime films
 Stella Kon (born 1944), Singaporean playwright
 Yōsuke Kon (born 1978), Japanese professional ice hockey player

See also 
 Kon (disambiguation)

Japanese-language surnames